French Leave is a collection of memoirs written by the English author Michael de Larrabeiti. It was published in 2003 in the United Kingdom by Robert Hale.

2003 non-fiction books
Books by Michael de Larrabeiti
Robert Hale books